Bayview is a collaboration of small fishing communities along the southern island of Twillingate, Newfoundland and Labrador. The communities within Bayview were formerly called Bluff Head Cove, Gillard's Cove, Manuel's Cove and Ragged Point. Older residents of the community still refer to these places separately but street signs only read Bayview and Ragged Point.

Basically Bayview consists of one main road, formerly named Rink Road and recently changed to Bayview Street along with many side streets such as Point Road, Gillard's Lane and Greenham's Point. There is one Salvation Army church in the community and a closed grocery store.

Bayview is now a part of the Town of Twillingate.

See also 

Twillingate, Newfoundland and Labrador
Little Harbour, Newfoundland and Labrador
Purcell's Harbour, Newfoundland and Labrador
Crow Head, Newfoundland and Labrador
Back Harbour, Newfoundland and Labrador
Durrell, Newfoundland and Labrador

Former towns in Newfoundland and Labrador
Populated places in Newfoundland and Labrador